Toller is a ward in the metropolitan borough of the City of Bradford, West Yorkshire, England.  It contains 16 listed buildings that are recorded in the National Heritage List for England.  Of these, one is listed at Grade II*, the middle of the three grades, and the others are at Grade II, the lowest grade.  The ward is to the northwest of the centre of Bradford, and is largely residential.  Most of the listed buildings are cottages in pairs, rows or blocks.  The ward contains Manningham Mills, the largest mill in Bradford, which is listed at Grade II*.  The other listed buildings include a lodge and a fountain associated with Chellow Dean, a large house and its entrance lodge, a former public house, a school, a group of almshouses, an archway with gates formerly leading to a house, and a church.


Key

Buildings

References

Citations

Sources

 

Lists of listed buildings in West Yorkshire
Listed